Tetracha lucifera is a species of tiger beetle that was described by Wilhelm Ferdinand Erichson in 1847, and can be found only in Bolivia and Peru.

References

Beetles described in 1847
Beetles of South America
Cicindelidae